Goran Marić may refer to:

 Goran Marić (footballer) (born 1984), Serbian footballer
 Goran Marić (volleyball) (born 1981), Serbian volleyball player
 Goran Marić (politician) (fl. 2016–2019), Croatian Minister of State Property

See also
 Goran Maričić